Paddy O'Carroll (17 February 1866 – 29 December 1960) was an Irish hurler who played for club sides Ballyduff and Kilmoyley, and at inter-county level with the Kerry senior hurling team.

Playing career

Born in Ballyduff, County Kerry, O'Carroll first played hurling with the local club. He won a County Championship title in 1891, a victory which allowed Ballyduff represent Kerry in the 1891 Munster Championship. He ended the provincial campaign with a winners' medal after a win over Limerick in the final. Kerry subsequently faced Wexford in the 1891 All-Ireland final, with O'Carroll once again selected on the team, and went on to claim a 2–03 to 1–05 win after extra time. O'Carroll won a second County Championship medal in 1895, this time lining out with Kilmoyley.

Death

O'Carroll died in Ballyduff on 29 December 1960. At the time of his death he was the last surviving member of Kerry's All-Ireland-winning team.

Honours

Ballyduff
Kerry Senior Hurling Championship (1): 1891

Ballyduff
Kerry Senior Hurling Championship (1): 1895

Kerry
All-Ireland Senior Hurling Championship (1): 1891
Munster Senior Hurling Championship (1): 1891

References

1866 births
1960 deaths
All-Ireland Senior Hurling Championship winners
Ballyduff (Kerry) hurlers
Irish farmers
Kerry inter-county hurlers
Kilmoyley hurlers